Gennings is a surname. Notable people with the surname include:

 Edmund Gennings (1567–1591), English martyr
 John Gennings ( 1570–1660), English Roman Catholic priest, brother of Edmund

See also
 Jennings